Standings and results for Group 7 of the UEFA Euro 2004 qualifying tournament.

Group 7 consisted of England, Liechtenstein, Macedonia, Slovakia and Turkey. Group winners were England, who finished one point clear of second-placed team Turkey who qualified for the play-offs.

Standings

Matches

Goalscorers

Notes

References

UEFA Page
RSSSF Page

Group 7
Euro
qual
2002–03 in Turkish football
2003–04 in Turkish football
2002–03 in Republic of Macedonia football
2003–04 in Republic of Macedonia football
2002–03 in Slovak football
2003–04 in Slovak football
2002–03 in Liechtenstein football
2003–04 in Liechtenstein football